Segmentina nitida, the shining ram's-horn snail, is a species of minute, air-breathing, freshwater snail, an aquatic gastropod mollusc or micromollusc in the family Planorbidae, the ramshorn snails.

Description

The shell of this species is sinistral in coiling and almost planispiral in shape. The spire is deeply sunken. The surface of the shell is glossy.

The maximum shell diameter is about 7 mm.

Habitat
This species lives in water weeds, in ponds and marsh drainage ditches. It is uncommon to rare.

Distribution
This species occurs in countries and islands including:
 Czech Republic - vulnerable (VU)
 British Isles - listed in List of endangered species in the British Isles.
 Great Britain in England  - endangered (EN)
 Germany - endangered (gefährdet)
 Latvia
 Netherlands
 Poland
 Slovakia

References

External links
 
 Photos of Segmentina nitida

Planorbidae
Gastropods described in 1774
Taxa named by Otto Friedrich Müller